Massimiliano Ferraro (born 6 February 1991) is an Italian sprinter.

Achievements

National titles
Ferraro won a national championship at individual senior level.

Italian Indoor Athletics Championships
60 m: 2017

See also
 Italy at the European Athletics Team Championships

References

External links
 

1991 births
Living people
Italian male sprinters
Athletes from Naples
20th-century Italian people
21st-century Italian people